"I Want You Back" is a song by American boy band NSYNC, from their debut studio album, 'N Sync (1997). It was released in Germany on October 4, 1996, as the band's debut single. The dance-pop and pop song was later released in the United States on February 17, 1998, and in the United Kingdom on February 15, 1999. It was written by Max Martin and the producer Denniz Pop. In its initial release, "I Want You Back" peaked at number four in Germany, and topped the charts in the Netherlands. After releasing internationally, the song charted at number 13 on the US Billboard Hot 100, and at number five on the UK Singles Chart. Two music videos for "I Want You Back" were released for the song's initial release and global re-release, which were directed by Alan Calzatti, and Jesse Vaughan and Douglas Biro respectively.

Background and composition
"I Want You Back" was written and produced by Max Martin and his then-mentor Denniz Pop. NSYNC were flown over to Stockholm to record the song in 1996. In a 2018 interview with Billboard, band member Joey Fatone described the song as "edgy for pop" and was apprehensive about its reception with listeners. "I Want You Back" was released as a CD single in Germany on October 4, 1996, and eventually in the United States on February 17, 1998. The song was also distributed in the United Kingdom on February 15, 1999.

Musically, "I Want You Back" is a dance-pop and pop song. According to the sheet music that was published on Musicnotes.com by Universal Music Publishing Group, the song is set in the time signature of  common time, with a tempo of 110 beats per minute, while composed in the key of G minor. NSYNC's vocals on the track ranges from the low note of E4 to the high note of G5, while the song is constructed in verse–chorus form.

Commercial performance

"I Want You Back" peaked in the top 10 in Germany, Switzerland, New Zealand, and Canada. The song also topped the chart in the Netherlands. It peaked at number 13 on the Billboard Hot 100. The song was certified gold in the United States, Germany, and Australia.

Music videos
Two versions of the music video for "I Want You Back" were released: one for the song's original release, and the other for its global re-release.

Original version
The first video was shot in Stockholm, Sweden from August 15–16, 1996 by Alan Calzatti. It was released with the original German release of the song in October 1996. It depicts the NSYNC members in a space station, with many high-tech effects playing out around them. The video was filmed using a green screen, as each member walked on treadmills. The band attempt to contact a girl through a computer, in order to bring her onto the ship, while they are dancing throughout the video.

Alternate version
The second video accompanied the British and US release of the song in 1998 and was directed by Jesse Vaughan and Douglas Biro in America. The video was partially shot in grayscale, and depicts NSYNC performing in a warehouse, playing pool, riding jet-skis, and driving around the neighborhood with a girl in a Cadillac. JC Chasez opined that this version was the moment where "we just made a real music video".

Track listing

 German maxi single (1996)
 "I Want You Back" (Radio Version) – 3:22
 "I Want You Back" (Long Version) – 4:23
 "I Want You Back" (Club Version) – 5:24
 "I Want You Back" (Progressive Dub Mix) – 5:26

 UK & European maxi single (1997)
 "I Want You Back" (Radio Version) – 3:22
 "Tearin' Up My Heart" (Radio Version) – 3:26
 "You Got It" – 3:34
 "I Want You Back" (Club Version) – 5:24

 UK & European CD single 1 (1998)
 "I Want You Back" (Radio Version) – 3:22
 "I Just Wanna Be with You" – 4:02
 "I Want You Back" (Riprock & Alex G.'s Smooth Vibe Mix) – 4:28

 UK & European CD single 2 (1998)
 "I Want You Back" (Radio Version) – 3:22
 "Everything I Own" – 4:10
 Exclusive interview – 5:06

 US cassette single (1996)
 "I Want You Back" (Radio Version) – 3:20
 "Giddy Up" – 4:07

 US maxi single (1998)
 "I Want You Back" (Hot Tracks Extended Version) – 5:23
 "I Want You Back" (Riprock's Elevation Mix) – 5:28
 "I Want You Back" (Florian's Transcontinent Club Mix) – 5:45
 "I Want You Back" (Riprock & Alex G.'s Smooth Vibe Mix) – 4:27

Charts

Weekly charts

Year-end charts

Certifications

Release history

References

1996 songs
1996 debut singles
1998 singles
NSYNC songs
RCA Records singles
Songs written by Max Martin
Song recordings produced by Denniz Pop
Song recordings produced by Max Martin
Torch songs
1999 singles